Elton Ngwatala (born 23 May 1993) is a French professional footballer who plays as a winger for French club AC Cambrai.

Career
Born in Corbeil-Essonnes, Ngwatala spent his early career with Beauvais II, Beauvais, Chambly and Kidderminster Harriers. In May 2017 he attended the V9 Academy.

In May 2018 it was announced that he would join Scottish club Dundee for the 2018–19 season. He made his debut for the club on 14 July 2018, in the Scottish League Cup. Ngwatala was released by the club in January 2019.

Ngwatala signed for AFC Fylde on 24 August 2019, on a non-contract basis. He moved to Chester on 29 November 2019.

In September 2022, Ngwatala returned from a nearly 3-year hiatus from competitive football after signing with sixth-tier French club AC Cambrai.

References

1993 births
Living people
French footballers
AS Beauvais Oise players
FC Chambly Oise players
Kidderminster Harriers F.C. players
V9 Academy players
Dundee F.C. players
AFC Fylde players
Chester F.C. players
Association football wingers
French expatriate footballers
French expatriate sportspeople in England
Expatriate footballers in England
French expatriate sportspeople in Scotland
Expatriate footballers in Scotland
National League (English football) players
Scottish Professional Football League players

Régional 1 players
AC Cambrai players